Nagavanshi (IAST: Nāgavaṃśī) refers to any of the several Indian Kshatriya dynasties or ruling groups claiming descent from the mythical Nāgas. Along with Suryavanshi, Chandravanshi and Agnivanshi, the Nagavanshi clans form a part of the Kshatriya class in the Varna system of India. The notable members of this class include:

 Nagvanshis of Chotanagpur, who ruled in Chota Nagpur, Jharkhand
 Nagas of Padmavati, who ruled in Madhya Pradesh
 Nagas of Vidisha, who ruled in Madhya Pradesh
 Nagas of Vindhyatabi, ancient dynasty of Odisha
 Nagas of Kalahandi, who ruled in Kalahandi, Odisha
 Chindaka Naga, who ruled in Chhattisgarh and Odisha, and whose kingdom was called Chakrakot; also known as Chhindaka Nagas or Nagvanshis or Barsur
 Alupas, ancient dynasty of Karnataka
 Bunts, who ruled coastal Karnataka
 Nairs, who ruled most parts of Kerala

References 

 
Hindu snake worship
Ethnic groups in South Asia
Ethnic groups in India